Frank Neal Stephen Marrocco served as a Canadian judge from 2005 until 2020 and as Associate Chief Justice of the Superior Court of Justice from 2013 to 2020. He was initially appointed to the Superior Court of Justice in 2005 on the recommendation of Prime Minister Paul Martin  and then elevated in 2013 to Associate Chief Justice by Prime Minister Stephen Harper.

Marrocco is a former Queen's Counsel and was a partner at Gowlings. He was first elected as a Bencher of the Law Society of Upper Canada in 1995, and he was elected its treasurer (the highest elected position) in 2003.

In July 2020, Marrocco was appointed by the Ontario Government as a Member of the Independent Long-Term Care COVID-19 Commission.

References

Treasurers of the Law Society of Upper Canada
Judges in Ontario
Living people
Year of birth missing (living people)